The Skaudinis is a river of  Kėdainiai district municipality, Kaunas County, central Lithuania. It originates next to Puodžiai village, 1.5 km from Šlapaberžė, then flows across the Kalnaberžė Forest, then reaches the Kruostas river from the left side, forming a deep valley. By the Skaudinis and Kruostas confluence Vaidatoniai hillfort is located.

The river passes through Puodžiai, Vaidatoniai and Mociūnai villages.

The name Skaudinis comes from Lithuanian skaudus or skaudrus ('swift, torrential, hasty, pungent').

References

Rivers of Lithuania
Kėdainiai District Municipality